Claudia Andrea Burr Huerta (Santiago, October 1, 1968) is a Chilean film and television actress.

Her first appearance on television was in Marrón Glacé telenovela on Channel 13. She stood out in the television series Estúpido Cupido on Televisión Nacional de Chile (1995), where she played the beloved antagonist, Isabel Margarita Dublé.  In 1999 participates in the TVN television series Aquelarre where he plays Eduarda Patiño.

In 2000, after participating in the telenovela Santo ladrón, Burr left Chilean television and moved to live in France, where she worked making documentaries and playing small roles in short films. Her return to television took place in 2004, with the telenovela Tentación. From that date on, she was in productions of different Chilean channels and acted in two national films: Grado 3 in 2009, and Baby Shower in 2011.

Between 2012 and 2016 the actress lived in Lund, southern Sweden, with her partner, the photographer Mario Salazar. In that country, she acted in the SVT miniseries Viva Hate.

Filmography

Films

Telenovela

TV Series

References 

1968 births
20th-century Chilean actresses
21st-century Chilean actresses
Chilean film actresses
Chilean television actresses
Chilean telenovela actresses
Living people
Actresses from Santiago